Jagera pseudorhus, commonly named foambark, is a species of rainforest trees, in the northern half of eastern Australia and in New Guinea, constituting part of the flowering plant family Sapindaceae. Named for the saponin foam that forms on the bark after heavy rain.

In Australia, they grow naturally from the Manning River (35° S), New South Wales to the Bloomfield River (15° S) in far north Queensland. 
In New Guinea they grow naturally widespread.
The habitat is tropical and sub-tropical rainforests, monsoon forest and gallery forest on soils of good fertility. Other common names include ferntop and pink tamarind.

Two varieties have formal botanical descriptions:
 Jagera pseudorhus var. integerrima  – endemic to the Atherton Tableland, Qld, Australia
 Jagera pseudorhus var. pseudorhus – NSW, Qld, Australia and New Guinea

Description
Though smaller in cultivation. The bark is smooth and grey with horizontal raised ridges. The base of larger trees are often flanged.

Leaves are alternate and pinnate with eight to twenty six leaflets. The leaflets 4 to 6 cm long. Toothed, not equal at the base, with a pointed tip. Branchlets and the underside of leaves hairy.

Yellow brown flowers form on panicles in the months of March to May. The fruit forms in August to November. Capsules mature to a brown colour, after being a violet pink. One seed in each cell, being covered in aril. Care needs to be taken when handling the capsule, as the hairs may cause skin irritation.

Fruit eaten by the Australian king parrot and the green catbird. Germination from fresh seed is not particularly difficult.

Uses
The form of this tree makes it well suited as an ornamental. Indigenous Australians use foam from crushed bark or leaves as a fish poison to kill fish enabling easy catching. The foam was also used as a soap.

References

Sapindaceae
Sapindales of Australia
Trees of Australia
Flora of Queensland
Flora of New South Wales
Ornamental trees